Iris Miriam Ruiz Class (born January 29, 1951) is a Puerto Rican politician who served in the Puerto Rico House of Representatives and currently holds the office of Ombudswoman.

Ruiz, a member of the New Progressive Party, served as At-Large Representative from 1997 to 2010 and as Chairwoman of the New Progressive Party Women's Organization from 2002 to 2010. She was designated by Puerto Rico Governor Luis Fortuño as the Puerto Rico Ombudsman or "Ombudswoman" in March 2010.

A former television reporter, she is married to former Representative Roberto Cruz Rodríguez, a member of the opposition Popular Democratic Party.

References

|-

Living people
New Progressive Party members of the House of Representatives of Puerto Rico
Ombudspersons in Puerto Rico
People from Río Piedras, Puerto Rico
Puerto Rican women in politics
University of Puerto Rico alumni
1951 births